Francis Clark may refer to:

 Francis J. Clark (1912–1981), United States Army soldier
 Francis Edward Clark (1851–1927), American clergyman
 Francis Clark of the Clark baronets
 Francis Clark (1799–1853), silversmith and magistrate in Birmingham, England, founder of South Australian company Francis Clark and Sons

See also
 Francis Clarke (disambiguation)
 Francis Clark Howell (1925–2007), American anthropologist
 Francis Clerke (disambiguation)
 Frank Clark (disambiguation)
 Frank Clarke (disambiguation)